John Atkins may refer to:

 John Atkins (American football) (born 1992), NFL defensive end
 John Atkins (cyclist) (born 1942), English cyclist
 John Atkins (MP) (1754–1838), English politician
 John Atkins (naval surgeon) (1685–1757), English doctor and author
 John Atkins (writer) (1916–2009), British writer
 John Black Atkins (1871–1954), British journalist
 John C. Atkins (born 1970), American politician from Delaware
 John DeWitt Clinton Atkins (1825–1908), American politician
 John F. Atkins (born 1944), Irish scientist

See also
 John Tracy Atkyns (died 1773), English barrister-at-law
 John Adkins (disambiguation)